Goat Island is a small island in the Canadian province of Ontario, located in the town of Northeastern Manitoulin and the Islands in the Manitoulin District.

Transportation

Highway 6 passes through the island, crossing from Manitoulin Island via the Little Current Swing Bridge. Built in 1913 as a railway bridge, it has carried road traffic since 1946.

At the other end of the island, a fixed bridge carries the highway to Great La Cloche Island. The only other road on the island, Goat Island Road, is a service road that circles around the west end of the island. Goat Island Road has cul de sac that ends on the northwest corner of the island and separate by a narrow section of the North Channel from the a dirt trail leading off from Highway 6 on Great La Cloche Island. The former Highway 6 cross was cut off after the roadway was re-aligned to the east end of the island in 1998.

Communities
The only community located on the island is Turner. A small tank farm is used by E. B. Eddy to store chemicals for their Espanola, Ontario plant and Goat Island Range is a golf driving range is the only business of the island.

There are two transformer stations found off Goat Island Road and Highway 6.

References

Lake islands of Ontario
Landforms of Manitoulin District
Islands of Lake Huron in Ontario